{{Infobox automobile
| name = GAZ-A
| image = File:GAZ-А.JPG
| manufacturer = GAZ
| production = 1932-1936
| class = passenger car
| layout = FR layout
| successor = GAZ-M1
| engine = 3.29 L GAZ-A (Ford L-head-4)'
| predecessor= 
| transmission = 3-speed manual
| wheelbase = 
| length = 
| width = 
| height = 
| weight = 
| related = Ford Model AGAZ-AA
}}
The GAZ-A is a passenger car that was mass-produced by GAZ from 1932 until 1936. It was the first passenger car to be produced in the Soviet Union and is a near-exact copy of the Ford Model A from 1930. To the local population, the car was nicknamed "Gazik".

 History 
The cooperation between the Ford Motor Company and Russia dates back to the year 1909. Ford was an important supplier of passenger cars and commercial vehicles such as tractors and trucks, especially in the 1910s and 1920s. Tens of thousands were imported into the Soviet Union because their own vehicle industry was underdeveloped. The first five-year plan of 1928, which generally contributed greatly to the development of the Soviet industry, also envisaged building a domestic automobile production. In 1929, an official contract was signed with Ford, which provided that the USSR every year should buy large quantities kits for Ford models to them in the newly built Nizhny Novgorod Automobile Plant'', short NAZ (from 1933 GAZ) assembly. Vehicles were also assembled at the KIM plant in Moscow.

As early as the beginning of 1931, the Soviet government stated that the projected quantities were significantly too large. The Great Depression hit both Ford and the Soviet Union, significantly fewer kits were needed.

By the end of 1932, the factory in Nizhny Novgorod had been brought up to a level where it was able to produce automobiles. The first cars left the halls on the 8 December 1932. At about the same time, the production of the GAZ-AA began. This was a truck that was built on the same chassis and took over many other vehicle parts from the car. The drawings for the vehicle were still from Ford.

By 1935, 100,000 vehicles had been built in the new plant, mostly trucks. In the same year, the contract between Ford and the Soviet Union was dissolved by mutual agreement. In 1936, production ended after 41,917 copies in favor of the successor GAZ-M1.

References

GAZ Group vehicles
Trucks of the Soviet Union
Cars introduced in 1932
1930s cars
First car made by manufacturer